Luis Guillermo Eichhorn (26 June 1942 – 25 May 2022) was an Argentine prelate of the Catholic Church.

Eichhorn was born in Gilbert, Entre Ríos, Argentina), son of Doña Emilia D' Angelo and Don Enrique Eichhorn. He was ordained to the priesthood in 1968 at the Basilica of the Immaculate Conception of Uruguay. He served as bishop of the Diocese of Gualeguaychú, Argentina, from 1996 to 2004 and as bishop of the Diocese of Morón, Argentina from 2004 until his retirement in 2017.  Upon his retirement he was appointed Bishop Emeritus of Gualeguaychú.

Eichorn died on 25 May 2022, at the age of 79.

References

1942 births
2022 deaths
Bishops appointed by Pope John Paul II
People from Entre Ríos Province
20th-century Roman Catholic bishops in Argentina
21st-century Roman Catholic bishops in Argentina
Roman Catholic bishops of Gualeguaychú
Roman Catholic bishops of Morón
Argentine people of German descent